René Kuipers (born 2 February 1960) is a Dutch rally driver.

Complete WRC results

External links
 Profile at eWRC-results.com

1960 births
Dutch rally drivers
Living people
Dakar Rally drivers
World Rally Championship drivers